Meridian High School is a public secondary school located in the North-Whatcom community Laurel, Washington (north of Bellingham).
During the 2010–11 school year, official enrollment was documented at 467 students in grades 9–12. It is currently the only high school in the Meridian School District.

Athletics 
Beginning in the 2006–07 school year, Meridian teams compete once again in the WIAA "1A" classification.  From 1997 through 2006, Meridian was classified as "2A" but had been "1A" pre-1997.

State championships
Teams
 Football: 1999 (2A), 2003 (2A), 2006 (1A)
 Volleyball: 1998 (2A), 2004 (2A)
 Girls' soccer: 2007 (1A)
 Boys' Track: 1975 4X400 Andy Zamudio,Paul Parsons,Darrell Steiber,Dan Staton.(1A)

References

External links 
 Official School Website
 MeridianFootball.Com

High schools in Whatcom County, Washington
Public high schools in Washington (state)